Tom Eric Vraalsen (26 January 1936 – 13 September 2021) was a Norwegian ambassador and politician for the Centre Party. He served as the Norwegian Minister of International Development from 1989 to 1990, as well as Minister of Nordic Cooperation. 

He received a master's degree in economics from the University of Århus, Denmark, before joining the Norwegian Foreign Service in 1960. He was the Norwegian Ambassador to the United Kingdom of Great Britain and Northern Ireland from 1994 to 1996, to the United States of America from 1996 to 2001 and to Finland from 2001 to 2003. He received an Honorary Doctorate Degree from the Augustana College Commencement in Sioux Falls, South Dakota on 21 May 2000.

Vraalsen was also the Permanent Representative & Ambassador of Norway to the United Nations from 1982 to 1989. From 1998 to 2004, he held the position of the UN Secretary-General's Special Envoy for Humanitarian affairs for the Sudan. He is the author of numerous papers an articles on African socio-economic development issues and on conflict prevention and resolution, including two books on the UN, The UN - Dream and Reality (1984) and UN in Focus (1975), which he co-authored.

He was also chairman of Task Force for International Cooperation on Holocaust Education, Remembrance, and Research under the Norwegian Chairmanship 2009-2010.

He was married and has five children.

References

1936 births
2021 deaths
Diplomats from Oslo
Ambassadors of Norway to the United States
Ambassadors of Norway to the United Kingdom
Ministers of International Development of Norway
Permanent Representatives of Norway to the United Nations
Politicians from Oslo